Murray Taulagi (born 12 March 1999) is an Australia international rugby league footballer who plays as a er or  for the North Queensland Cowboys in the NRL.

Background
Taulagi was born in Auckland, New Zealand, is of Samoan descent.
His older brother, Jamie-Jerry, is a professional rugby union player, who previously played for Super Rugby sides, the Queensland Reds and Sunwolves.

He grew up playing rugby union for Otahuhu RFC before moving to Brisbane, Queensland in 2011. In Brisbane, he attended Brisbane State High School, playing fullback for their rugby union side.

In 2016, while playing in the GPS competition, Taulagi was spotted by North Queensland Cowboys recruitment manager Clint Zammit and signed with the NRL club, despite having never played rugby league.

Playing career

Early career
In 2017, Taulagi relocated to Townsville and joined the Cowboys under-20 squad. He began the season playing for the Townsville Blackhawks Mal Meninga Cup side before making his NYC debut for the Cowboys, scoring two tries in a victory over the St George Illawarra Dragons. In June 2017, he started at centre for the Queensland under-18 side, scoring a try in their loss to New South Wales. On 17 July 2017, he signed a two-year NRL contract with the Cowboys.

In 2018, Taulagi spent the entire season playing for the Cowboys' Queensland Cup feeder club, the Northern Pride, scoring nine tries in 19 games. In June 2018, he started on the wing for the Queensland under-20 side in their win over New South Wales. In October, he started on the wing for the Junior Kangaroos in their win over the Junior Kiwis. 

Following the 2018 season, Taulagi was elevated to the Cowboys' Top 30 NRL squad.

2019
In 2019, Taulagi switched Queensland Cup sides, joining North Queensland's other feeder club, the Townsville Blackhawks. On 22 February, he tore his medial collateral ligament (MCL) in a pre-season trial against the Gold Coast Titans, ruling him out for six weeks. On 5 April, he re-signed with the North Queensland outfit until the end of 2021.

He returned from injury in Round 5, playing just four games before tearing his lateral meniscus against the CQ Capras, which forced him to miss nine weeks. On 10 July, he started at centre and scored a try in the Queensland under-20 side's loss to New South Wales.

In Round 18 of the 2019 NRL season, Taulagi made his NRL debut for the North Queensland club against South Sydney. In Round 23, he scored his first NRL try in North Queensland's 24–10 win over the Penrith Panthers.

2020
In February, Taulagi was a member of the North Queensland 2020 NRL Nines winning squad. He played four NRL games for the North Queensland club in 2020, finishing the season as a starting .

2021
In round 11 of the 2021 NRL season, he scored a hat-trick  for North Queensland in a 36–20 victory over Newcastle.

2022
In round 10 of the 2022 NRL season, he scored two tries for North Queensland in a 36-12 victory over the Wests Tigers.

Taulagi played 25 matches for North Queensland in the 2022 NRL season as the club finished third on the table and qualified for the finals. Taulagi played in both finals matches including their preliminary final loss to Parramatta. He finished as the clubs top try scorer for the season with 17 tries.

In October he was named in the Australia squad for the 2021 Rugby League World Cup. In the third group stage match at the 2021 Rugby League World Cup, Taulagi scored two tries for Australia in their 66-6 victory over Italy.

Achievements and accolades

Team
2020 NRL Nines: North Queensland Cowboys – Winners

Statistics

NRL
 Statistics are correct to the end of the 2020 season

References

External links

North Queensland Cowboys profile
NRL profile

1999 births
Living people
Australia national rugby league team players
New Zealand rugby league players
New Zealand sportspeople of Samoan descent
New Zealand emigrants to Australia
North Queensland Cowboys players
Northern Pride RLFC players
People educated at Brisbane State High School
Rugby league wingers
Rugby league centres
Rugby league players from Auckland
Townsville Blackhawks players